Drago may refer to:

People
 Drago (given name)
 Drago (surname)
 Drago (wrestler), Mexican professional wrestler Víctor Soto
 Drago Dumbovic, Croatian footballer known simply as Drago
 Drago, nickname of Alexander Volkov
 Prince del Drago, 1860–1956, Italian noble and New York socialite

Fictional characters
 Ivan Drago, a boxer in the film Rocky IV
 Blackie Drago, a supervillain from Marvel Comics
 Drago, a character from Jackie Chan Adventures
 Dragos, dinosaur-like creatures in the video game Mother 3
 Drago, the Dragonoid from Bakugan series

Other uses
 Drago (fabric mill)
 Drago (publisher), International publishing house of contemporary art
 Drago (river), Sicily
 Drago Doctrine, announced in 1902 by the Argentine Minister of Foreign Affairs, Luis María Drago
 Drago restaurants of California
 Drago Tree, common name for the species Dracaena draco

See also 

 Proper names derived from Drag-
 Proper names derived from Draz-
 Dragon (disambiguation)
 Draco (disambiguation)
 Dracaena (disambiguation)
 Dragovići (disambiguation)
 Dragovich (disambiguation)
 Dragovic (disambiguation)
 Dragosloveni (disambiguation)
 Drăgoiești (disambiguation)